Gedanoborus is a genus of flies belonging to the family Chaoboridae.

The species of this genus are found in Central Europe.

Species:
 Gedanoborus kerneggeri Szadziewski & Gilka, 2007 
 Gedanoborus resinatus Seredszus & Wichard, 2009

References

Chaoboridae